Oasisamerica is a term that was coined by Paul Kirchhoff (who also coined "Mesoamerica") and published in a 1954 article, and is used by some scholars, primarily Mexican anthropologists, for the broad cultural area defining pre-Columbian southwestern North America. It extends from modern-day Utah down to southern Chihuahua, and from the coast on the Gulf of California eastward to the Río Bravo river valley. Its name comes from its position in relationship with the similar regions of Mesoamerica and mostly nomadic Aridoamerica. The term Greater Southwest is often used to describe this region by American anthropologists.

As opposed to their nomadic Aridoamerican neighbors, the Oasisamericans primarily had agricultural societies.

List of peoples

Ak Chin, Arizona
 Southern Athabaskan
Chiricahua Apache, New Mexico and Oklahoma
Jicarilla Apache, New Mexico
Lipan Apache, Texas
Mescalero Apache, New Mexico
Navajo (Navaho, Diné), Arizona and New Mexico
San Carlos Apache, Arizona
Tonto Apache, Arizona
Western Apache (Coyotero Apache), Arizona
White Mountain Apache, Arizona
Aranama (Hanáma, Hanáme, Chaimamé, Chariname, Xaraname, Taraname)
Coahuiltecan, Texas, northern Mexico
Cocopa, Arizona, northern Mexico
Comecrudo Texas, northern Mexico
Cotoname (Carrizo de Camargo)
Halchidhoma, Arizona and California
Hualapai, Arizona
Havasupai, Arizona
Hohokam, formerly Arizona
Karankawa, Texas
Kavelchadhom
La Junta, Texas, Chihuahua
Mamulique, Texas, northern Mexico
Manso, Texas, Chihuahua
Maricopa, Arizona
Mojave, Arizona, California, and Nevada
Pima, Arizona
Pima Bajo
Pueblo peoples, Arizona, New Mexico, Western Texas
Ancestral Pueblo, formerly Arizona, Colorado, New Mexico, Utah
Hopi-Tewa (Arizona Tewa, Hano), Arizona, joined the Hopi during the Pueblo Revolt
Hopi, Arizona
Keres people, New Mexico
Acoma Pueblo, New Mexico
Cochiti Pueblo, New Mexico
Kewa Pueblo (formerly Santo Domingo Pueblo), New Mexico
Laguna Pueblo, New Mexico
San Felipe Pueblo, New Mexico
Santa Ana Pueblo, New Mexico
Zia Pueblo, New Mexico
Tewa people, New Mexico
Nambé Pueblo, New Mexico
Ohkay Owingeh (formerly San Juan Pueblo), New Mexico
Pojoaque Pueblo, New Mexico
San Ildefonso Pueblo, New Mexico
Tesuque Pueblo, New Mexico
Santa Clara Pueblo, New Mexico
Tiwa people, New Mexico
Isleta Pueblo, New Mexico
Picuris Pueblo, New Mexico
Sandia Pueblo, New Mexico
Taos Pueblo, New Mexico
Ysleta del Sur Pueblo (Tigua Pueblo), Texas
Piro Pueblo, New Mexico
Towa people
Jemez Pueblo (Walatowa), New Mexico
Pecos (Ciquique) Pueblo, New Mexico
Zuni people (Ashiwi), New Mexico
Quechan (Yuma), Arizona and California
Quems
Solano, Coahuila, Texas
Tamique
Toboso
Tohono O'odham, Arizona and Mexico
Qahatika, Arizona
Tompiro
Ubate
Walapai, Arizona
Yaqui (Yoeme), Arizona, Sonora
Yavapai, Arizona
Tolkapaya (Western Yavapai), Arizona
Yavapé (Northwestern Yavapai), Arizona
Kwevkapaya (Southeastern Yavapai), Arizona
Wipukpa (Northeastern Yavapai), Arizona
Affiliated and related groups
Genízaros, originating from the Great Plains, recognized as an indigenous group in the US state of New Mexico
Hispanos, most have mestizo ancestry, particularly in New Mexico
Californios, California (The Californias)
Hispanos of New Mexico (Santa Fe de Nuevo México)
Tejanos, Texas (Coahuila y Tejas)

Geography
The term "Oasisamerica" is derived from a combination of the terms "oasis" and "America". It refers to a wild land dominated by the Rocky Mountains and the Sierra Madre Occidental. To the east and west of these enormous mountain ranges stretch the grand arid plains of the Sonora, Chihuahua, and Arizona Deserts. At its height, Oasisamerica covered part of the present-day Mexican states of Chihuahua, Sonora and Baja California, as well as the U.S. states of Arizona, Utah, New Mexico, Colorado, Nevada, and California.

Despite being a basically dry land, Oasisamerica contains several bodies of water like rivers: Yaqui, Rio Grande, Colorado, Conchos and Gila Rivers. The presence of these rivers (and even some lakes that have since been swallowed by the desert), combined with a climate that was much milder than eastern Aridoamerica, allowed the development of agricultural techniques that were imported from Mesoamerica.

Characteristics of the Oasisamerican cultures

Cultural development
The story of the origins of the cultural superarea of Mesoamerica takes place some 2000 years after the separation of Mesoamerica and Aridoamerica. Some of the Aridoamerican communities farmed as a complement to their hunter-gatherer economy. Those communities, among whom one finds adherents to the Desert tradition, later would become more truly agricultural and form Oasisamerica.

Based on maize remnants found in Bat Cave, Arizona, it appears that agriculture practices date back to at least 3500 BC. Given that the oldest traces of maize in Mesoamerica date back to the year 5000 BC, it would seem that the hypothesis of importation of agriculture from the south is correct. It is less certain who brought the agricultural technology and what role they played in the development of the high cultures of Oasisamerica.

At least three hypotheses have been proposed to explain the birth of the cultures of Oasisamerica. One, an endogenous model, posits an independent cultural development whose roots lie deep in antiquity. From this point of view, thanks to a superior climate, the ancient desert communities would have been able to develop agriculture much as the Mesoamericans did.

A second hypothesis presupposes that the nomads of the Mesoamerican culture slowly moved northward over time. Thus, the Oasisamericans would be an offshoot of their neighbors to the south. In this view, the development of the Oasisamerican cultures, much like the northern Mesoamerican cultures, began with a group of outsiders who were closely tied to the local original inhabitants of western Mexico.

There are many indications of a close relationship between the two great cultural regions of North America. For one, the turquoise that the Mesoamericans prized so dearly came almost exclusively from southern New Mexico and Arizona. Demand for this mineral alone may have played a large part in establishing trade relationships between the two cultural areas. At the same time, in Paquimé, a site connected to the Mogollon culture, there have been found ceremonial structures related to Mesoamerican religion and an important number of skeletons of Macaws that were carefully transported from the forests of southeastern Mexico.

Cultural areas

The area encompassed by Oasisamerica fostered the growth of several major cultural groups: the Ancestral Pueblo people, Hohokam, Mogollon, Pataya, and Fremont. Smaller cultures within this region include the Sinagua.

Ancestral Pueblo
 

Ancestral Pueblo cultures flourished in the region currently known as the Four Corners. The territory was covered by juniper forests which the ancient peoples learned to exploit for their own needs, since foraging among the other vegetation only sufficed for half of the year, only to fail from November to April. The Ancestral Pueblo society is one of the most complex to be found in Oasisamerica, and they are assumed to be the ancestors of the modern Pueblo people (including the Zuñi and Hopi).  (The term "Anasazi" is also used to describe these cultures. It is a Navajo term meaning "enemy ancestors."

The Ancestral Pueblo is considered to be the most intensely studied Pre-Columbian culture in the United States. Archaeological investigation has established a sequence of cultural development that began before the first century BC and extended to AD 1540 when the Pueblo Indians were subjugated by the Spanish Crown. This long period encompasses the Basketmaker I, II, and III phases followed by the Pueblo I, II, III, and IV phases. In the Basketmaker II phase, the Ancestral Pueblo took up residence in caves and rocky shelters, and in Basketmaker III Era (AD 500–750) they constructed the first subterranean cities with up to four abodes in a circular arrangement.

The Pueblo period begins with the development of ceramics. The most prominent feature of these ceramics is the predominance of pieces of a white or red color with black designs. During the Pueblo I phase (AD 750–900), the Ancestral Pueblo developed their first irrigation systems, and their former subterranean habitations were slowly replaced by houses constructed of masonry. Pueblo II (900–1150) is defined by the construction of great works of architecture, including multi-family, multi-story dwellings. The following phase of Pueblo III (1150–1350) witnessed the greatest expansion of Ancestral Pueblo agriculture as well as the construction of large regional communication networks that would persist until the Pueblo IV Era. In Pueblo IV (1350–1600), much of the earlier society disintegrated along with the communication networks.

The reasons underpinning the decline of the Ancestral Pueblo remain somewhat of a mystery. The phenomenon is thought to be associated with a prolonged drought that befell the region from 1276 to 1299. When the Europeans arrived at the Ancestral Pueblo region, it was populated by the Pueblo Indians, a group without a unified ethnicity. The Zuni had no apparent relatives; the Hopi spoke an Uto-Aztecan language; the Tewas and Tiwas were Tanoanos and the Navajo were Athabaskans.

The religion of the Pueblo Indians was based upon the worship of plant-like deities and the fertility of the earth. They believed that supernatural beings called the kachina had come to the surface of the earth from the sipapu (center of the earth) at the moment of the creation of the human race. Worship in Pueblo societies was organized by secret all-male groups that met in kivas. The members of these secret societies claimed to represent the kachina.

Hohokam

The Hohokam occupied the desert-like lands of Arizona and Sonora. The Hohokam territory is bounded by two large rivers, the Salt River (Arizona) and Gila Rivers, that outline the heart of the Sonora Desert. The surrounding ecosystem presented many challenges to agriculture and human life because of its high temperatures and scant rainfall. Due to these factors, the Hohokam were forced to construct irrigation systems with elaborate webs of reservoirs and canals for the Salt and Gila rivers that could reach several meters in depth and 10 km in length. Thanks to these canals, the Hohokam harvested as many as two crops of corn annually.

The principal settlements of the Hohokam culture were Snaketown, Casa Grande, Red Mountain, and Pueblo de los Muertos, all of which are to be found in modern-day Arizona. The Hohokam lived in small communities of several hundred people. Their lifestyle was very similar to that of the Ancestral Pueblo in their Basketmaker III phase: semisubterranean but with spacious interiors. Several other artifacts are unique to the Hohokam, including conch necklaces (imported from the coastal regions of Greater California and Sonora) etched with acids produced by pitaya fermentation; and axes, trowels, and other stone instruments.

Archaeologists dispute the origins and ethnic identity of the Hohokam culture. Some hold that the culture developed endogenously (without outside influence), pointing to Snaketown which had its origins in the fourth century BC. Others believe the culture to be a product of migration from Mesoamerica. In defense of this line of thought, proponents point to the fact that Hohokam ceramics appeared in 300 BC. (also the time of Snaketown's founding), and that before this time, there was no indication of an independent regional development of ceramics. Along the same line of reasoning, several other technological advances like the canal works and certain cultural phenomena like cremation seem to have originated in western Mesoamerica.

The development of the Hohokam culture is divided into four periods: Pioneer (300 BC – AD 550), Colonial (550–900), Sedentary (900–1100), and Classical (1100–1450). The Pioneer period commenced with the construction of the canal works. In the Colonial period, ties were strengthened with Mesoamerica. Proof of this can be found in the recovery of copper bells, pyrite mirrors, and the construction of ball courts. The relations with Mesoamerica and the presence of such traded goods indicate that by the Colonial period the Hohokam had already become organized into chiefdoms. Relations with Mesoamerica would diminish in the following period, and the Hohokam turned to construct multi-story buildings like Casa Grande.

By the time the Europeans arrived in the Arizona and Sonora Deserts, a region which they named Pimería Alta, the urban centers of the Hohokam had already become abandoned presumably due to the health and ecological disasters that befell the indigenous social system. The Tohono O'odham live in this region and speak a Uto-Aztecan language. This community had an economy based on gathering and incipient agriculture on mountain slopes. They were a semi-nomadic people, probably because they had to migrate in order to compensate for the scarcity of food resources in the foothills of the mountains they called home.

Mogollon

The Mogollon was a cultural area of Mesoamerica that extended from the foothills of the Sierra Madre Occidental, northward to Arizona and New Mexico in the southwestern United States. Some scholars prefer to distinguish between two broad cultural traditions in this area: the Mogollon itself and the Paquime culture that was derived from it. Either way, the peoples who inhabited the area in question adapted well to a landscape that was marked by the presence of pine forests and steep mountains and ravines.

In contrast to their Hohokam and Ancestral Pueblo neighbors to the north, the Mogollons usually buried their dead. The culture's graves often included ceramic art and semiprecious stones. Because the Mogollon burial sites displayed such wealth, they were often looted by grave robbers who sought to sell their spoils on the archaeological black market.

Perhaps the most impressive Mogollon ceramic tradition was to be found in the valley of the Mimbres River in New Mexico. The ceramic production of this region became most developed between the eighth and twelfth centuries. It was characterized by white pieces decorated with stylized representations of daily life in the community that created them. This was a very exceptional approach in a cultural area whose pottery was otherwise dominated by geometric patterns.

As another contrast with the Hohokam and Ancestral Pueblo, there is no widely accepted chronology for the development of the Mogollon culture. The scholars Alfredo López Austin and Leonardo López Luján, for their historical analysis of the region, borrowed a chronology proposed earlier by Paul Martin, who himself divided Mogollon history into two general periods; the "Early" period runs from 500 BC until AD 1000, and the "Late" period begins in the eleventh and goes to the sixteenth century.

The first period featured a more or less slow cultural development. Technological changes were produced very gradually, and the form of social relationships and organizational patterns remained almost static for 1500 years. During the Early period, the Mogollons lived in rocky dwellings from which they defended themselves from the incursions of their hunter neighbors. Much like the Ancestral Pueblo, the Mogollon also lived in semisubterranean abodes that often featured a kiva.

In the eleventh century, the population in the Mogollon area multiplied much more rapidly than it had in the preceding centuries. It is probably that in this period, the area benefited from trade relations with Mesoamerica, a fact that facilitated the development of agriculture and the stratification of society. It is also possible that Ancestral Pueblo influence could have grown at this time, because the Mogollon began to construct buildings of masonry, just like their northern neighbors.

The Mogollon culture reached its height in the fourteenth and fifteenth centuries. At this time, the culture's major centers grew in population, size, and power. Paquime, in Chihuahua, was perhaps the largest of those. It dominated a mountainous region that contains many archaeological sites known as casas alcantilado, outposts constructed in hard-to-reach caves on the eastern slopes of the Sierra Madre. Paquime traded with the heart of Mesoamerica, to which it provided precious minerals like turquoise and cinnabar. It also controlled the trade of certain products from the coasts of the Gulf of California, especially its Nassarius conch shells. Paquime received heavy influence from the Mesoamerican societies, as evidenced by the presence of arenas for the Mesoamerican ballgame and the remains of animals native to tropical Central America like the macaw.

The decline of the main centers of Mogollon power began in the thirteenth century, even before the apex of Paquime. By the fifteenth century, a large part of the region had become abandoned by its former inhabitants. The people of the Mimbres River emigrated and eventually settled in present-day Coahuila. It is supposed that the Taracahitas (including the Yaquis, Mayos, Opatas, and Tarahumaras) that currently live in northeastern Mexico are descendants of the Mogollones.

Fremont

The Fremont area covered a large part of modern-day Utah. It was situated to the north of the Ancestral Pueblo cultural area. Its cultural development as a part of Oasisamerica took place between the fifth and fourteenth centuries. Scholars contend that the Fremont culture was derived from the Ancestral Pueblo culture. Theoretically, the Fremont communities would have emigrated toward the north, bringing with them the customs, social organization structures, and technology of the Ancestral Pueblo. This hypothesis neatly explains the presence of ceramics in Utah that are very similar to those found in Mesa Verde.

A second hypothesis suggests that the Fremont culture may have been derived from buffalo-hunting societies, probably from a culture of Athabaskan origin. As time passed, the foreign culture would have adopted the culture of their southern neighbors. In both this theory and the aforementioned, there is a justification for the less-complex development in Fremont as opposed to other regions of Oasisamerica because of their more suitable climates for agriculture.

The decay of the Fremont culture began as early as the second half of the 10th century and was completed in the 14th century. Upon the Spaniards' arrival, the region was occupied by the Shoshones, an Uto-Aztecan group.

Pataya

The Patayan area occupies the western part of Oasisamerica. It comprises the modern-day states of California and Arizona in the U.S., and Baja California and Sonora in Mexico. The Patayans were a peripheral culture whose cultural development was probably influenced by their Hohokam neighbors to the east. From them they would have learned the Mesoamerican ballgame, cremation techniques, and techniques for the production of ceramics.

The Patayan culture began to disappear in the fourteenth century. When the Spanish arrived in the region, the Colorado River Valley was only occupied by the river-dwelling Yuman peoples.

See also
 Agriculture in the prehistoric Southwest
 History of Mesoamerica (Paleo-Indian)
 Mesoamerica
 Paleo-Indians
 List of dwellings of Pueblo peoples
 Southwestern archaeology

Notes

References
 

 
 
Pre-Columbian cultural areas
Formative period in the Americas
History of indigenous peoples of North America
Native American history
Archaeological sites in Chihuahua (state)
Puebloan peoples